Luxembourg, also called Belgian Luxembourg, is the southernmost province of Wallonia and of Belgium. It borders on the country of Luxembourg to the east, the French departments of Ardennes, Meuse and Meurthe-et-Moselle to the south and southwest, and the Walloon provinces of Namur and Liège to the north. Its capital and largest city is Arlon, in the south-east of the province.

It is significantly larger (71%), but much less populous than the neighbouring Grand Duchy of Luxembourg. About eighty percent of the province is part of the densely wooded Ardennes region. The southernmost region of the province is called Gaume or Belgian Lorraine (main city: Virton).
 
The Arelerland or Arlon region (in red on the map of arrondissements, below) bordering the neighbouring Grand-Duchy of Luxembourg has the particularity that many of its residents have historically spoken Luxembourgish, a language closely related to German, rather than the French or Walloon spoken elsewhere in the province.

The province was separated from the neighbouring Luxembourg by the Third Partition of Luxembourg, de jure in 1830–31 by the Conference of London dealing with the consequences of the Belgian Revolution of 1830, de facto in 1839, after William I, King of the Netherlands and Grand Duke of Luxembourg, agreed to its decisions and thus the province was given to the newly created Kingdom of Belgium.

An unofficial flag of the province exists, with the actual colours of Luxembourg (red, white, and blue), as well as the province's coat of arms on the foreground.

Subdivisions

Luxembourg province is divided into five administrative districts containing a total of 44 municipalities.

Economy 
The gross domestic product (GDP) of the province was €7.0 billion in 2018, accounting for 1.5% of Belgium's economic output. GDP per capita adjusted for purchasing power was €21,800 or 72% of the EU27 average in the same year. Luxembourg was the province with the lowest GDP per capita.

See also
History of Luxembourg

References

External links

 

 
NUTS 2 statistical regions of the European Union
States and territories established in 1839
Provinces of Wallonia
1839 establishments in Belgium